Nicky Broujos (born in the United States) is an American retired soccer player.

References

Year of birth missing (living people)
Living people
American soccer players
Penn-Jersey Spirit players
St Patrick's Athletic F.C. players
Sligo Rovers F.C. players
Shelbourne F.C. players
Bray Wanderers F.C. players
Cliftonville F.C. players
League of Ireland players
Association footballers not categorized by position